Wim De Smet (October 19, 1932 – March 10, 2012) was a Flemish zoologist, specialized in marine mammals, and an esperantist. He published a lot of scientific and popularizing articles in Dutch, English, French and Esperanto. He projected an entirely new system for the naming and classification of animals and plants.

Career Anonymous 2001, p.94
De Smet graduated in zoology in 1954 at the Catholic University of Louvain  after which he became a teacher in secondary schools (1955–61) and completed his studies and researches at foreign universities : Bloemfontein, Padua, Stockholm, Glasgow (and later also in Amsterdam, Utrecht and in research institutes in Londen, Copenhagen and Stockholm). 
In 1961 he was appointed as a Junior Researcher of the National (Belgian) Research Fund (1961–1963). In 1966 De Smet earned a doctor's degree at the Catholic University of Louvain. In the years 1963–1968 he worked as an Educational Assistant at the Institute of Natural Sciences. In 1968–1980 he was a Senior Research Worker at the Antwerp University Centre.  In 1975, because of his merits in the domain of marine mammals, De Smet was adjudged the Henri Schouteden-award by the Royal Flemish Academy of Belgium for Science and the Arts. In 1980–1984 he was in charge of the Department of the General Scientific Services at the Institute of Natural Sciences. He served as a Professor of Zoology at the  National University of Ruanda (1986–1987) and at similar institutions  in Suriname (1988–1990) and Gabon (1991–1994) until his retirement in 1994. 

Later, as Full Professor of the Akademio Internacia de la Sciencoj San Marino he still lectured at summer schools  in Trier and  Bydgoszcz.

Esperanto

Since 1957 De Smet took an interest in Esperanto. He was a well-known figure in the local, Flemish kaj international Esperanto-movement. In this connection he published a text-book for self-study in 1982. He was the main initiator of the idea for coming off the 67-nd World Congress of Esperanto in Antwerp. Because of an Esperanto written contribution, De Smet earned the UMEA-award in Japan. 

De Smet was a full member of the Akademio Internacia de la Sciencoj (AIS) of San Marino, since the foundation of this academy.

New Biological Nomenclature
During his career daily confronted with the imperfections of the existing zoological nomenclature, already in the 1950s De Smet began developing an entirely new concept, without distinction between animals or plants, even with the possibility of housing the bacteria into the system. Translating the existing names into Esperanto is not the point, but a simplification, modernization and better handling of the ancient respectable Systema naturae. One of the aims was limiting the number of names, for example by elimination of the names of the genera.

De Smet defined "New Biological Nomenclature" as follows:

New Biological Nomenclature  is NOT : the naming of animals and plants into Esperanto.

But it IS : a new nomenclature-system that relies on new ideas and that uses Esperanto for its names.

New Biological Nomencalature (N.B.N.) is a system :
 which can be used in parallel with the nomenclature of Linnaeus, and without hampering it;
 which forms names in a logical manner;
 which relies on the present-day knowledge of biology;
 which is not troubled by obsolete traditions in nomenclature;
 which allows finding the position of a species in the whole of living things;
 which employs names that are easily to commit to memory and to pronounce;
 which introduces a new definition of "type";
 which gives new chances for the taxonomists to lay out new collections and to select in them their N.B.N.-types;
 which applies for enthusiasm and collaboration of a lot of people in order to propose N.B.N.-names;
 which warrants efficiency.

Further reading
 Anonymous 1989 : Men of Achievement, Thirteenth Edition, International Biographical Centre, Cambridge, CB2 3QP, Great Britain, p. 222.
 Anonymous 2001 : 2000 Outstanding Scientists of the 20th Century, Second Edition, International Biographical Centre, Cambridge, Great Britain, p. 94.
 De Smet, W.M.A. 1973 : Initiation à la Nomenclature Biologique Nouvelle (N.B.N.), Kalmthout, 44p.
 De Smet, W.M.A. 1982 : Esperanto snel assimileren. Uitgeverij De Nederlanden, Antwerpen, 151p. 
 De Smet, W.M.A. 1990 : Specio kaj genro en la biologio, Scienca Revuo, 41, 365–370.
 De Smet W.M.A. 1991a : Meeting User Needs by an Alternative Nomenclature, in: Improving the Stability of Names : needs and options (D.L. Hawksworth, ed.), Regnum Vegetabile, no 123, 179–181, Koeltz Scientific Books, Königstein.
 De Smet W.M.A. 1991b : Kennismaking met Nieuwe Biologische Nomenklatuur (N.B.N.), Vereniging voor het Invoeren van Nieuwe Biologische Nomenklatuur (N.B.N.), Kalmthout, 87 p.
 De Smet, W.M.A. 1991c : A Guide to New Biological Nomenclature (N.B.N.), Association for the Introduction of New Biological Nomenclature, Kalmthout, 64 p.
 De Smet, W.M.A. 1991d : La Sistemo N.B.N. ( Nova Biologia Nomenklaturo ), Asocio por la Enkonduko de Nova Biologia Nomenklaturo, Kalmthout, 94 p.
 De Smet W.M.A. 2000 : Nova Biologia Nomenklaturo (N.B.N.) en la jaro 2000 kaj la problemoj pri nomoj de bestoj kaj plantoj, Fakaj aplikoj de Esperanto. Serio : Aplikoj de Esperanto en Scienco kaj Tekniko, 77–87.
 De Smet W.M.A. 2005 : An analysis of New Biological Nomenclature. Analizo de Nova Biologia Nomenklaturo; SAIS, Nitra, A.I.S, San Marino.

References

External links
 Articles of Wim de Smet (in Esperanto (EBEA) (search with "smet" in ĉiuj kampoj)
Webpage of Scienca Revuo
 Scienca Revuo 1949–2000.
 Greuter, Werner 2004 : Recent Developments in International Biological Nomenclature, Turk.J.Bot., 28, 17–24.

Belgian zoologists
Belgian Esperantists
1932 births
2012 deaths